James Mazarelo (born 4 February 2001) is an English field hockey player who plays as a goalkeeper for Loughborough Students.

Club career
Mazarelo plays club hockey in the Men's England Hockey League Division 1 North for Loughborough Students.
He started playing for Bowdon and represented England U-16s, U-18s and U-21s and GB U-21s.

References

External links

Profile on England Hockey

2001 births
Living people
English male field hockey players
Loughborough Students field hockey players
Place of birth missing (living people)
Male field hockey goalkeepers
2023 Men's FIH Hockey World Cup players
Commonwealth Games bronze medallists for England
Commonwealth Games medallists in field hockey
Field hockey players at the 2022 Commonwealth Games
Medallists at the 2022 Commonwealth Games